Dorothea (née Schmid) Hofmann (born 9 October 1929), also known as Dorli is a Swiss graphic designer, artist, educator and the author of Die Geburt eines Stils (The Birth of a Style). She is one of the first students who passed the Basel education model. She took several educational trips to various parts of the world. Hofmann collaborated closely with her partner Armin on developing design education.

Life and work 
Hofmann trained as a graphic designer at Schule für Gestaltung Basel, Switzerland. Dorothea married graphic designer and pedagogue Armin Hofmann in 1953 during her third year of a graphic design course where Armin was her teacher. Armin had opened a graphic design studio with Dorothea in 1947. They have been married for over 60 years and lived together in Lucerne, Switzerland.Hoffmann undertook numerous further education trips to Italy, Spain, France, Holland, Mexico, Guatemala, Egypt, India, the US and more. 

Dorothea Hofmann has taught at various art and design schools such as Yale University School of Art, New York Studio School of Drawing, Painting and Sculpture, Atlanta College of Art, Museo de Arte Contemporaneo de Oaxaca in Mexico, The New York Studio School of Art, and the National Institute of Design Ahmedabad and has presented her work at exhibitions in Switzerland and abroad. When the Hofmanns visited National Institute of Design in Ahmedabad, Dorothea acted as Armin's translator while he advised in the formulation of the graphic design course and she took one course in Letter Design at the institute in 1964 during the six months spent there.  The Hoffmans had their summer home at Brissago where the in-between semesters Yale Graphic Design workshops took place from 1977 to 1996. 

Hofmann's book Die Geburt eines Stils (The Birth of a Style) studies the influence of the Basel education model on Swiss graphic Design. It includes works of Swiss Graphic designers who were teachers and students of Basel Allgemeine Gewerbeschule or Schule für Gestaltung Basel, like Hermann Eidenbenz, Emil Ruder, Armin Hofmann, Karl Gerstner, Gérard Ifert, Nelly Rudin, Pierre Mendell, Wolfgang Weingart, Kenneth Hiebert, Dan Friedman (graphic designer), April Greiman, Thérèse Moll, Elisabeth Dietschi, Heidi Schatzmann, Sigrid Bovensiepen, Inge Druckrey, Barbara Stauffacher Solomon and more.

Exhibitions 
Hofmann’s first verified exhibition was Dorothea Hofmann, Meret Oppenheim, K.R.H. Sonderborg - Zeichnungen at Galerie Handschin in Basel in 1966, and the most recent exhibition was 39è Mini print Internacional de Cadaqués a Pineda at Fundació Tharrats d’Art Gràfic in Barcelona in 2019. Hofmann is most frequently exhibited in Spain, but also had exhibitions in United States, Switzerland.

Some of her notable exhibitions have been:

Solo Exhibitions 
 1990 - Dorothea Hoffman: Drawing Exhibition - Rosenwald-Wolf Gallery - The University of the Arts, Philadelphia, USA
 1986 - Dorothea Hoffman: Drawings and Etchings - Galleries at Moore College of Art & Design, Philadelphia, USA

Group Exhibitions 
 2019 - 39è Mini print Internacional de Cadaqués a Pineda - Fundació Tharrats d’Art Gràfic, Barcelona, Spain
 2019 - 39é Mini Print Internacional de Cadaqués 2019 - Mini Print Internacional de Cadaqués, Barcelona, Spain
 2018 - 38th Mini Print Internacional De Cadaques 2018 - Mini Print Internacional de Cadaqués, Barcelona, Spain
 1999 - Armin and Dorothea Hofmann - The Corcoran Gallery of Art, Washington, DC, United States
 1966 - Dorothea Hofmann, Meret Oppenheim, K.R.H. Sonderborg - Zeichnungen - Galerie Handschin, Basel, Switzerland

References 

Graphic designers

Swiss graphic designers
1929 births
Living people
Swiss women artists

Designers at National Institute of Design
